John Wesley's New Room is a historic building in Broadmead, Bristol, England. Opened in 1739, it housed the earliest Methodist societies, and was enlarged in 1748. As the oldest purpose-built Methodist preaching house (chapel), it has been designated by Historic England as a Grade I listed building. 

A Methodist museum is housed in the preachers' rooms above the chapel. The courtyards around the building contain statues of John Wesley and his brother Charles.

History and architecture
In March 1739 John Wesley began preaching in the open fields at Bristol, and founded societies there. Under Wesley's direction, the building followed two months later, making it the oldest purpose-built Methodist chapel in the world. He called it "our New Room in the Horsefair".

The chapel was built with a double-decker pulpit, which was common at the time, and is lighted by an octagonal lantern window to reduce the amount paid in window tax. In addition to meetings and worship, the New Room was used as a dispensary and schoolroom for the poor people of the area. The pews and benches were made from old ship timber. The Baldwin and Nicholas Street Methodist societies combined to form the United Society, which met at the New Room from 3 June 1739. Wesley insisted that meetings at the New Room should only be held outside of Anglican church hours as he wanted Methodism to complement rather than compete with Anglican worship.

In 1748 it was extended, possibly by the Quaker architect George Tully in view of the stylistic similarities with the Friends' Meeting House at Quakers Friars of the same period. John Wesley believed that liturgical worship should be carried out in churches, and only reluctantly allowed the enlarged New Room to comply with the Toleration Act of 1689, making it a formal place of worship. Rooms were built above the chapel, in which Wesley and other travelling preachers stayed. Wesley lived at the New Room from 1748 to 1771 and administered Holy Communion there when his brother Charles was away. Wesley added to the Methodist offer in Bristol by selling his published works from a bookstore in the New Room. Analysis of the complete printed output of Bristol between 1695 and 1775 shows that over half was written by Methodists.

After Wesley's death, in 1808 the property passed into the hands of the Welsh Calvinistic Methodists. In 1929 it was bought back by the Wesleyan Methodist Church. The John Snetzler Chamber Organ of 1761 is a 20th-century addition following the restoration of the building in 1929 by Sir George Oatley.

A garden in the Broadmead Courtyard was opened on 24 May 2011 by the Lord Mayor of Bristol. This was followed by the opening of the Horsefair Visitor Centre on 13 July 2017 by the Duke of Gloucester. The new facilities include a café, library and archive and conference and education facilities, plus an expanded interactive museum housed in the twelve upstairs rooms of the 1748 building. As the oldest purpose-built Methodist building in the world it has become a centre of international pilgrimage.

See also
 Charles Wesley's House (Bristol)
 Wesley's Chapel (London)
 Churches in Bristol
 Grade I listed buildings in Bristol

References

External links

 
 The New Room (John Wesley's Chapel) – Methodist Heritage

Churches completed in 1739
New Room
Museums in Bristol
Religious museums in England
Biographical museums in Bristol
Chapels in England
History of Methodism
1739 establishments in England
18th-century Methodist church buildings
18th-century churches in the United Kingdom